You Gotta Believe is the second and final studio album by American hip hop group Marky Mark and the Funky Bunch, released on September 15, 1992. The album peaked at number 67 on the US Billboard 200.

Two singles were released from the album: "You Gotta Believe" and "Gonna Have a Good Time". "You Gotta Believe" peaked at number 49 on the US Billboard Hot 100, number 54 in the UK Singles Chart, number 55 in Australia and number 34 in New Zealand. 

Marky Mark would go on to make two albums with reggae artist Prince Ital Joe without the Funky Bunch before later becoming an actor, using his real name Mark Wahlberg.

Track listing

Charts

References

External links
You Gotta Believe at Discogs

Mark Wahlberg albums
1992 albums
Interscope Records albums

Atlantic Records albums